The Leopard Stakes (Japanese レパードステークス) is a Grade 3 horse race for three-year-old Thoroughbreds run in August over a distance of 1800 metres at Niigata Racecourse.

The race was first run in 2009 and was promoted to Grade 3 status in 2011.

Winners since 2009  

 The 2010 winner Miracle Legend was a filly

See also
 Horse racing in Japan
 List of Japanese flat horse races

References

Dirt races in Japan